Tarrington, Virginia also known as Tarrington on the James is an upper-class neighborhood located in Midlothian, Virginia, a part of Chesterfield County. The community is located between Virginia State Route 711 (Robious Road).

The community is also home of James River High School and is adjacent to Robious Landing Park.

Tarrington began construction in the mid-2000s and finished construction in the mid-2010s. The planned community contains 710 homes.

References 

Unincorporated communities in Chesterfield County, Virginia
Greater Richmond Region
Unincorporated communities in Virginia